Gianluca Galasso (born 18 January 1984) is an Italian footballer who plays as a right back.

Career

Roma
Born in Lazio region, Galasso started his professional career at capital club A.S. Roma. He played his first Serie A match at the last match-day of the 2003–04 season, which the result is unaffected to ranking.

In July 2004, he was loaned to Salernitana to gain experience at Serie B. Although finished as mid-table with team, the team relegated due to financial problems. In August 2005, he was loaned to Ternana at Serie B, with option to buy for €100,000 with counter-option. This time Galasso first tasted relegation due to finished at the bottoms. However Ternana decided to buy Galasso outright but Roma paid €100,000 in net back to Ternana to cancel the buy option. On 31 August 2006, the last day of transfer windows, he was signed by Frosinone of Serie B, for €125,000.

Bari
In July 2007, A.S. Bari of Serie B signed him in co-ownership deal, for €180,000. Galasso played his 100th Serie B match at Bari, and won Serie B champion in 2009. In June 2009 Roma gave up the remain registration rights to Bari. But he was excluded in Bari's Serie A plan. In mid-2009, he was loaned to Salernitana along with team-mate Giuseppe Statella and Francesco Caputo. But he played as fullback.

In June 2011 he was released by A.S. Bari.

Honours
Serie B Champion: 2008–09

References

External links

Italian footballers
A.S. Roma players
U.S. Salernitana 1919 players
Ternana Calcio players
Frosinone Calcio players
S.S.C. Bari players
U.S. Triestina Calcio 1918 players
Serie A players
Serie B players
Italy youth international footballers
Association football midfielders
People from Latina, Lazio
1984 births
Living people
Footballers from Lazio
Sportspeople from the Province of Latina